Michael "Mike" McCusker (born June 23, 1966) is an American film editor. He has been nominated twice for the Academy Award for Best Film Editing, for the Johnny Cash biopic Walk the Line (2005) and Ford v Ferrari (2019), winning the latter. McCusker frequently collaborates with director James Mangold.

McCusker stated that editing is "a dance of the eyes. It's not just splicing two pieces of film together but compressing time, leading the audience, telling the story through images and dialogue."

Early life and education
Michael McCusker attended New Canaan High School in New Canaan, Connecticut, where he first began writing and making films. After graduation, he attended Emerson College, obtaining a bachelor of fine arts degree in film theory and production in 1988.

Career
McCusker was mentored by film editor David Brenner.

After graduating from Emerson, McCusker drove across country to West Hollywood, California, where he obtained work as a production assistant. Mike McCusker later worked on the television series, The Simpsons. He became interested in film editing and became an assistant editor on a Showtime anthology called Fallen Angels.

After joining the Motion Picture Editors Guild, McCusker teamed up as an assistant film editor to one of Oliver Stone's bevy of hot shot film editors, Academy Award-winning film editor David Brenner. Mike McCusker quickly became David Brenner's first assistant film editor, running the cutting room for five years on films such as The Patriot (2000) and Kate & Leopold (2001). Eventually David Brenner promoted McCusker to the position of associate editor.

When film director James Mangold asked editor David Brenner to cut Walk the Line, Brenner was unavailable. Mangold, in need of an editor with whom he was familiar, propositioned Mike McCusker, offering him the prestigious promotion to film editor. McCusker won the Academy Award for Best Film Editing for Ford v Ferrari with Andrew Buckland.

Personal life
McCusker is married to film producer Deirdre Morrison, whom he met while he was additional editor on the film The Day After Tomorrow.

Filmography

As Film Editor 
 Sax's Final Orbit (1997)
 Kings (1998)
 Walk the Line (Mangold-2005)
 Men in Trees (TV pilot) (2006)
 Walkout (Olmos-2006)
 3:10 to Yuma (Mangold-2007)
 Australia (Luhrmann-2008; with Dody Dorn)
 Hesher (Susser-2010)
 Knight and Day (Mangold-2010)
 The Amazing Spider-Man (Webb-2012)
 The Wolverine (Mangold-2013)
 Get on Up (Taylor-2014)
 13 Hours (Bay-2016)
 The Girl on the Train (Taylor-2016)
 Logan (Mangold-2017)
 Ford v. Ferrari (Mangold-2019)
 Unhinged (Borte - 2020)
 Sweet Girl (Andrew Mendoza-2021; with Matt Chessé)

As Assistant Film Editor 

 Independence Day (1996) (Assistant Editor)
 Speed 2: Cruise Control (1997) (Assistant Editor)
 What Dreams May Come (1998) (Assistant Editor)
 The Patriot (2000) (First Assistant Editor)
 Kate & Leopold (2001) (First Assistant Editor)
 Identity (2003) (Associate Editor)
 The Day After Tomorrow (2004) (Associate Editor)
 Fantastic Four: Rise of the Silver Surfer (2007) (additional editor)
 Captain America: The First Avenger (2011) (additional editor)
 The Dark Tower (2017) (additional editor)

Awards and nominations

See also
List of film director and editor collaborations

References

External links
 

1966 births
Living people
American Cinema Editors
American film editors
Best Editing BAFTA Award winners
Best Film Editing Academy Award winners
Emerson College alumni